Irving Taylor may refer to:

Irving Taylor (songwriter) (1914–1983), American composer, lyricist, and screenwriter
Irving Taylor (ice hockey) (1919–1991), Canadian ice hockey player